This is a complete list of the stage works of the Spanish composer Manuel de Falla (1876–1946).

List

References

Sources
Crichton, Ronald (1992), 'Falla, Manuel de' in The New Grove Dictionary of Opera, ed. Stanley Sadie (London) 

Lists of operas by composer
 
Lists of compositions by composer